Myrmecia fucosa is a species of ant in the genus Myrmecia. The first specimen of Myrmecia fucosa was described in 1934.

Myrmecia fucosa is mainly abundant in Victoria, and notably around Lake Hattah at the Hattah-Kulkyne National Park, which is not too far from Mildura.

References

Myrmeciinae
Hymenoptera of Australia
Insects described in 1934
Insects of Australia